Odontura is a fungal genus in the family Odontotremataceae. It is a monotypic genus, containing the single species Odontura rhaphidospora.

References

Ostropales
Ostropales genera